Schuylkill County Airport , also known as Schuylkill County Joe Zerbey Airport, is a public use airport located eight nautical miles (9 mi, 15 km) west of the central business district of Pottsville, a city in Schuylkill County, Pennsylvania, United States. It is owned by the Schuylkill County Airport Authority. This airport is included in the National Plan of Integrated Airport Systems for 2011–2015, which categorized it as a general aviation facility.

Although most U.S. airports use the same three-letter location identifier for the FAA and IATA, this airport is assigned ZER by the FAA but has no designation from the IATA (which assigned ZER to Zero Airport in Zero, Arunachal Pradesh, India). The airport's ICAO identifier is KZER.

Facilities and aircraft 
The airport covers an area of 34 acres (14 ha) at an elevation of 1,729 feet (527 m) above mean sea level. It has two runways: 11/29 is 4,594 by 75 feet (1,400 x 23 m) with an asphalt surface; 4/22 is 2,270 by 140 feet (692 x 43 m) with a turf surface.

For the 12-month period ending August 10, 2011, the airport had 28,100 aircraft operations, an average of 76 per day: 75% general aviation, 22% military, and 2% air taxi. At that time there were 25 aircraft based at this airport: 68% single-engine, 20% multi-engine, 4% jet, and 8% helicopter.

Charter service 
 University MedEvac

References

External links 
 Pottsville-Schuylkill County Airport
 Schuylkill County - Joe Zerbey Airport at Pennsylvania DOT Bureau of Aviation
 Aerial image as of April 1999 from USGS The National Map
 

Airports in Pennsylvania
County airports in Pennsylvania
Transportation buildings and structures in Schuylkill County, Pennsylvania